Willemijn Karsten (born 28 June 1986, in Hoorn) is a Dutch team handball player. She plays on the Dutch national team, and participated at the 2011 World Women's Handball Championship in Brazil.

References

1986 births
Living people
Dutch female handball players
People from Hoorn
Sportspeople from North Holland
Expatriate handball players
Dutch expatriate sportspeople in Germany
21st-century Dutch women